The men's 5000 metres race of the 2014–15 ISU Speed Skating World Cup 5, arranged in the Vikingskipet arena in Hamar, Norway, was held on 31 January 2015.

Jorrit Bergsma of the Netherlands won, followed by Douwe de Vries of the Netherlands in second place, and Sverre Lunde Pedersen of Norway in third place. Alexis Contin of France won Division B.

Results
The race took place on Saturday, 31 January, with Division B scheduled in the morning session, at 10:44, and Division A scheduled in the afternoon session, at 14:50.

Division A

Division B

References

Men 5000
5